Manuel Mascarenhas Homem was the Governor of Portuguese Ceylon and viceroy of Portuguese India.

References

Governors of Portuguese Ceylon
16th-century Portuguese people
17th-century Portuguese people
1657 deaths
Viceroys of Portuguese India